The Association for Cooperative Operations Research and Development (ACORD) is a non-profit organization in the insurance industry. ACORD publishes and maintains an archive of standardized forms. ACORD has also developed a comprehensive library of electronic data standards with more than 1200 standardized transaction types to support exchange of insurance data between trading partners. ACORD itself, though, is not an insurance company and does not process claims or provide insurance coverage of any kind.

History
Established in 1970 as a non-profit organization, ACORD was formed by insurance carriers and agents focused on building efficiencies in the United States property casualty insurance market. Originally named Agent Company Operations Research and Development (ACORD), the organization's initial goal was to standardize the many proprietary forms being used by carriers for new business and claims submission. In the late 1970s, ACORD began developing electronic standards to complement its form standards. ACORD subsequently expanded both its forms and electronic data standards beyond property and casualty insurance to encompass life and annuity, surety, and reinsurance markets. In 2021, a subsidiary of the company, ACORD Solutions Group, received the Insurance Innovator Award from PropertyCasualty360 for its digital solution ADEPT (ACORD Data Exchange Platform & Translator); the award is given to new technologies that are considered to be facilitating faster and more accurate data exchange in the insurance industry.

Current practices
Today, many of the forms and electronic data standards utilized by the insurance and related industries – both in the United States and in several countries across the globe – were developed by ACORD. Over 850 variants of these forms are available. The Lloyd's of London insurance market uses ACORD standards for messaging between counterparties. Lloyd's Core Data Record, an attempt to standardized data exchange, is based on ACORD standards.

In 2018, ACORD partnered with DataPro on the production of new software that would streamline the implementation of insurance data standards. The project was aimed at improving data integration between legacy data systems and a new wave of automated data processing systems.

ACORD also provided expertise on digital data standards for a collaboration with IBM, ISN, and Marsh to streamline the proof of insurance process with the help of blockchain technology. The partnership is an attempt to eliminate the time- and labor-intensive paper insurance certificates that dominate the global insurance market. A pilot project for the new platform, called Insurwave, launched in the spring of 2018, uses the blockchain to create a distributed ledger of insurance data and to automate recording of shipping information for maritime transactions.

ACORD has also worked with the Centre for Study of Insurance Operations on numerous initiatives including the development of North American XML data standards and the creation of a telematics data standard.

ACORD is headquartered in Pearl River, New York, and maintains an office in London, UK.

References 

Information technology organizations
Standards organizations
Insurance industry organizations
Organizations established in 1970
Organizations based in New York (state)